Ernest Edward Dilley (5 June 1896 – 4 January 1968) was an English professional footballer who played as a centre forward in the Football League for Reading.

References

People from Dorking
English footballers
Reading F.C. players
English Football League players
1896 births
1968 deaths
Brentford F.C. wartime guest players
Association football forwards
West Ham United F.C. wartime guest players